Thiosemicarbazide is the chemical compound with the formula H2NC(S)NHNH2.  A white, odorless solid, it is related to thiourea (H2NC(S)NH2) by the insertion of an NH center.  They are commonly used as ligands for transition metals. Many thiosemicarbazides are known.  These feature an organic substituent in place of one or more H's of the parent molecule. 4-Methyl-3-thiosemicarbazide is a simple example.

According to X-ray crystallography, the CSN3 core of the molecule is planar as are the three H's nearest the thiocarbonyl group.

Reactions
Thiosemicarbazides are precursors to thiosemicarbazones. They are precursors to heterocycles. Formylation of thiosemicarbazide provides access to triazole.

References

Thiosemicarbazone
Functional groups